The Arabe-class destroyers was a group of twelve destroyers built for the French Navy during the First World War.

Design and description
The French Navy ordered the Arabe-class ships from Japan as it was in desperate need of additional destroyers and there was no capacity to build more in France, Great Britain or the United States. The ships displaced  at normal load. They were powered by three vertical triple-expansion steam engines, each driving one propeller shaft, using steam provided by four mixed-firing Kampon Yarrow-type boilers. During their sea trials, the Arabe class reached . Their crew consisted of 5 officers and 104 crewmen.

The main armament of the Arabe-class ships was a single Type 41  gun, mounted before the bridge on the forecastle. Their secondary armament consisted of four Type 41  guns in single mounts; two of these were positioned abreast the middle funnel and the others were on the centerline further aft. One of these latter guns was on a high-angle mount and served as an anti-aircraft gun. The ships carried two above-water twin mounts for  torpedo tubes. In 1917–18, a rack for eight  depth charges was added.

Ships

  — launched 1917, struck 1936.
  — launched 1917, struck 1933.
  — launched 1917, struck 1936.
  — launched 1917, struck 1933.
  — launched 1917, struck 1936.
  — launched 1917, struck 1936.
  — launched 1917, struck 1935.
  — launched 1917, struck 1936.
  — launched 1917, struck 1936.
  — launched 1917, struck 1935.
  — launched 1917, struck 1936.
  — launched 1917, struck 1935.

Citations

References

External links

naval-history.net

Destroyer classes
 
 
Destroyers of Japan
France–Japan military relations
Ship classes of the French Navy